Aleqa Hammond (born 23 September 1965) is a Greenlandic politician and former member of the Danish Folketing (parliament). Formerly the leader of the Siumut party, she became Greenland's first female prime minister after her party emerged as the largest parliamentary faction in the 2013 elections. In 2014 she stepped down as Prime Minister and leader of Siumut, following a case of misuse of public funds. She was expelled from Siumut on 23 August 2016 after yet another case of misuse of public funds and became an independent. On 31 March 2018 she announced that she would be running in the 2018 Greenlandic parliamentary election for the Siumut breakaway Nunatta Qitornai.

Early life
Born in Narsaq, Hammond grew up in Uummannaq. Her father Piitaaraq Johansen died on a hunting trip when she was seven after falling through the ice. She attended Nunavut Arctic College in Iqaluit between 1989 and 1991, before studying at the University of Greenland from 1991 until 1993. Her studies were never completed.

In 1993, she began working for Greenland Tourism as a Regional Co-ordinator in Disko Bay. In 1994, she used a hotel room and knowingly supplied a credit card which had been blocked (from prior abuse) to cover the kr 5,000 bill, and she was convicted of fraud in 1996. In 1995, she became the Information Officer in the Cabinet secretariat, before working for Nuuk Tourism from 1996 until 1999. Between 1999 and 2003, she was commissioner of the Inuit Circumpolar Council, and also worked on the 2002 Arctic Winter Games. From 2004 to 2005 she worked in the tourism industry in Qaqortoq as a tourist guide.

Political career
She was first elected to the Parliament of Greenland in November 2005, and was appointed Minister for Families and Justice. In 2007, she became Minister of Finance and Foreign Affairs, but resigned in 2008 officially in protest of the size of the government's budget deficit.

After Siumut lost the 2009 elections, she replaced Hans Enoksen as party leader. In the 2013 elections, she received the highest-ever number of personal votes.
As Prime Minister she expressed her hope to experience Greenland becoming an independent country. She said: "We are talking about building a nation on a mental level. We will stand up as a people and demand what is rightfully ours. We will take responsibility for ourselves and for our families. And as politicians we will take responsibility for our country".
On 1 October 2014, Hammond took a leave of absence because she was being investigated for an expense scandal, and Kim Kielsen became acting prime minister, and also succeeded her as leader of the Siumut party. Kielsen later permanently replaced her.

In 2015, Hammond was elected to the Danish Folketing in the general elections. With 3,745 votes, she gained the highest number of personal votes in Greenland. She was expelled from Siumut on 23 August 2016 following a case of abuse of her Folketing credit card for private expenses and became an independent. In 2017, she became chairman of the Greenland Committee following an agreement to support the centre-right government. On 31 March 2018, she announced her candidacy for the Greenlandic parliament for Siumut breakaway Nunatta Qitornai.

Personal life 
She is a member of the New Apostolic Church.

References

External links

|-

1965 births
Female heads of government 
Members of the New Apostolic Church
Greenlandic Christians
Greenlandic Inuit people
Living people
Women members of the Parliament of Greenland
Members of the Parliament of Greenland
Nunavut Arctic College alumni
People from Kujalleq
People from Qaasuitsup
University of Greenland alumni
Siumut politicians
21st-century Danish women politicians
Prime Ministers of Greenland
Family ministers of Greenland
Finance ministers of Greenland
Foreign ministers of Greenland
Justice ministers of Greenland
Women government ministers of Greenland
Greenlandic members of the Folketing
Members of the Folketing 2015–2019
Women members of the Folketing